This is a list of destroyers of the United States Navy, sorted by hull number. It includes all of the series DD, DL, DDG, DLG, and DLGN.

CG-47 Ticonderoga and CG-48 Yorktown were approved as destroyers (DDG-47 and DDG-48) and redesignated cruisers before being laid down; it is uncertain whether CG-49 Vincennes and CG-50 Valley Forge were ever authorized as destroyers by the United States Congress (though the fact that the DDG sequence resumes with DDG-51 Arleigh Burke argues that they were).

Destroyer types listed
See also List of destroyer classes of the United States Navy. 

 DD  Destroyer
 DL  Destroyer Leader (later Frigate) (retired)
 DDG  Destroyer, Guided Missile
 FFG  Frigate, Guided Missile (abolished 30 June 1975)
 FFGN  Frigate, Guided Missile, Nuclear-Propulsion (abolished 30 June 1975)

Other destroyer types
These destroyer types are listed in other articles.

 DE: Destroyer escorts: List of destroyer escorts of the United States Navy
 DM: Destroyer minelayers: List of mine warfare vessels of the United States Navy § Light Minelayers (DM). 
 DMS: Destroyer minesweepers: List of mine warfare vessels of the United States Navy § High Speed/Destroyer Minesweepers (DMS).
 APD: High-speed transports, destroyers converted to land Marines ashore: List of United States Navy amphibious warfare ships § High-speed Transport (APD)
 AVD: Destroyer seaplane tenders: List of auxiliaries of the United States Navy § Destroyer Seaplane Tenders (AVD)

Destroyer leaders

The DL category was established in 1951, with the abolition of the experimental CLK category. CLK-1 became DL-1 and DDs 927–930 became DLs 2–5. By the mid-1950s the term destroyer leader had been dropped in favor of frigate. The DLG sequence was deactivated in the 1975 fleet realignment, most DLGs and DLGNs were reclassified as CGs and CGNs, 30 June 1975. However, DLG 6–15 became DDG 37–46. DL-1 through DL-5 had been decommissioned prior to this time; DLG-6 Farragut through DLG-15 Preble became DDG-37 through DDG-46.  DLG-16 Leahy through DLGN-40 Mississippi became CG-16 through CGN-40.

Guided missile destroyers

The guided missile destroyer sequence has three irregularities: four DDGs are numbered as if they were Destroyers in the main sequence (DDG-993, -994, -995 and -996), two were redesignated as guided missile cruisers (CG) (DDG-47 and DDG-48), and two numbers were skipped (DDG-49 and DDG-50). The  picks up at DDG-1000.

Ship list

See also
 List of current ships of the United States Navy
 List of US Navy ships sunk or damaged in action during World War II § Destroyer (DD)

References

External links
Museum ships
 USS Cassin Young (DD-793) - Boston National Historical Park, Charlestown, MA
 USS Charrette (DD-581) - Thessaloniki, Greece
 USS Edson (DD-946) - Saginaw Valley Naval Ship Museum, Bay City, MI
 USS Eversole (DD-789) - İnciraltı Sea Museum, İzmir, Turkey
 USS Joseph P. Kennedy Jr. (DD-850) - Battleship Cove, Fall River, MA
 USS Kidd (DD-661) - USS Kidd Veterans Museum, Baton Rouge, LA
 USS Laffey (DD-724) - Patriots Point Naval & Maritime Museum, Mount Pleasant, SC
 USS Orleck (DD-886) - Jacksonville Naval Museum, Jacksonville, FL
 USS Sarsfield (DD-837) - Anping Port, Taiwan
 USS The Sullivans (DD-537) - Buffalo and Erie County Naval & Military Park, Buffalo, NY
 USS Turner Joy (DD-951) - Bremerton Historic Ships Association, Bremerton, WA

 Destroyers
Destroyer
United States
Destroyers list